Italy competed at the 1996 Summer Olympics in Atlanta, United States. 340 competitors, 236 men and 104 women, took part in 172 events in 27 sports.

Medalists

Gold
 Antonio Rossi — Canoeing, Men's K1 500 metres Kayak Singles 
 Antonio Rossi and Daniele Scarpa — Canoeing, Men's K2 1.000 metres Kayak Pairs 
 Andrea Collinelli — Cycling, Men's 4.000 metres Individual Pursuit
 Silvio Martinello — Cycling, Men's Points Race
 Antonella Bellutti — Cycling, Women's Individual Pursuit
 Paola Pezzo — Cycling, Women's Cross-country Mountainbike
 Alessandro Puccini — Fencing, Men's Foil Individual Competition
 Maurizio Randazzo, Sandro Cuomo, and Angelo Mazzoni — Fencing, Men's Épée Team Competition
 Giovanna Trillini, Francesca Bortolozzi-Borella, and Valentina Vezzali — Fencing, Women's Foil Team Competition
 Yuri Chechi — Gymnastics, Men's Rings
 Agostino Abbagnale and Davide Tizzano — Rowing, Men's Double Sculls
 Roberto Di Donna — Shooting, Men's Air Pistol
 Ennio Falco — Shooting, Men's Skeet

Silver
 Fiona May — Athletics, Women's Long Jump
 Elisabetta Perrone — Athletics, Women's 10 km Walk
 Beniamino Bonomi — Canoeing, Men's K1 1.000 metres Kayak Singles 
 Beniamino Bonomi and Daniele Scarpa — Canoeing, Men's K2 500 metres Kayak Pairs
 Imelda Chiappa — Cycling, Women's Individual Road Race 
 Margherita Zalaffi, Laura Chiesa, and Elisa Uga — Fencing, Women's Épée Team Competition
 Valentina Vezzali — Fencing, Women's Foil Individual Competition
 Girolamo Giovinazzo — Judo, Men's Extra Lightweight (60 kg)
 Albano Pera — Shooting, Men's Double Trap
 Andrea Sartoretti, Paolo Tofoli, Andrea Zorzi, Pasquale Gravina, Marco Meoni, Samuele Papi, Luca Cantagalli, Andrea Gardini, Andrea Giani, Lorenzo Bernardi, Vigor Bovolenta, and Marco Bracci — Volleyball, Men's Team Competition

Bronze
 Michele Frangilli, Matteo Bisiani, and Andrea Parenti — Archery, Men's Team Competition
 Alessandro Lambruschini — Athletics, Men's 3.000 metres Steeplechase 
 Roberta Brunet — Athletics, Women's 5.000 metres 
 Josefa Idem Guerrini — Canoeing, Women's K1 500 metres Kayak Singles
 Raffaello Caserta, Luigi Tarantino, and Tonhi Terenzi – Fencing, Men's Sabre Team Competition
 Giovanna Trillini — Fencing, Women's Foil Individual Competition
 Ylenia Scapin — Judo, Women's Half Heavyweight (72 kg)
 Roberto Didonna — Shooting, Men's Free Pistol 
 Andrea Benelli — Shooting, Men's Skeet
 Emanuele Merisi — Swimming, Men's 200m Backstroke
 Leonardo Sottani, Carlo Silipo, Luca Giustolisi, Amedeo Pomilio, Francesco Postiglione, Roberto Calcaterra, Marco Gerini, Alberto Ghibellini, Alessandro Bovo, Alessandro Calcaterra, Alberto Angelini, Francesco Attolico, and Fabio Bencivenga — Water Polo, Men's Team Competition
 Alessandra Sensini — Sailing, Women's Mistral Individual Competition

Archery

The Italian men received unfortunate rankings in the open round, and both Andrea Parenti and Matteo Bisiani quickly found themselves losing to eventual silver medallist Magnus Petersson, in the second and third rounds, respectively.  Both had the highest score of any archer to lose in their round.  Michele Frangilli advanced to the quarterfinal before facing eventual gold medallist Justin Huish.  They won the bronze medal in the team round.

Women's Individual Competition:
 Giovanna Aldegani – round of 32, 28th place (1–1)
 Paola Fantato – round of 64, 54th place (0–1)
 Giuseppina di Blasi – round of 64, 60th place (0–1)

Men's Individual Competition:
 Michele Frangilli – quarterfinal, 6th place (3–1)
 Matteo Bisiani – round of 16, 9th place (2–1)
 Andrea Parenti – round of 32, 17th place (1–1)

Women's Team Competition:
 Aldegani, Fantato, and di Blasi – round of 16, 9th place (0–1)

Men's Team Competition:
 Frangilli, Bisiani, and Parenti – Bronze Medal Match (3–1) →  Bronze Medal

Athletics

Men's 100 metres 
 Ezio Madonia
 Stefano Tilli

Men's 200 metres 
 Sandro Floris

Men's 800 metres 
 Giuseppe D'Urso
 Andrea Benvenuti
 Andrea Giocondi

Men's 5,000 metres 
 Genny di Napoli
 Qualification — 14:03.56
 Semifinal — 13:28.80
 Final — 13:28.36 (→ 12th place)

 Stefano Baldini
 Qualification — 13:55.41
 Semifinal — 14:06.45 (→ did not advance)

Men's 10,000 metres 
 Stefano Baldini
 Qualification — 27:55.79
 Final — 29:07.77 (→ 18th place)

Men's Marathon
 Danilo Goffi — 2:15.08 (→ 9th place)
 Salvatore Bettiol — 2:17.27 (→ 20th place)
 Davide Milesi — 2:21.45 (→ 50th place)

Men's 4 × 100 m Relay
Giovanni Puggioni, Ezio Madonia, Angelo Cipolloni, and Sandro Floris
 Heat — did not finish (→ did not advance)

Men's 4 × 400 m Relay
Fabrizio Mori, Alessandro Aimar, Andrea Nuti, and Ashraf Saber
 Heat — 3:03.60 
 Semi Final — 3:02.56 (→ did not advance)

Men's 400m Hurdles
Fabrizio Mori
 Heat — 48.90s
 Semi Final — 48.43s
 Final — 48.41s (→ 6th place)

Laurent Ottoz
 Heat — 48.92s
 Semi Final — 48.52s (→ did not advance)

Ashraf Saber
 Heat — 49.71s (→ did not advance)

Men's 3,000 metres Steeplechase
Alessandro Lambruschini
 Heat — 8:31.69
 Semifinals — 8:27.32
 Final — 8:11.28 (→  Bronze Medal)

 Angelo Carosi
 Heat — 8:30.83 
 Semifinals — 8:21.86
 Final — 8:29.67 (→ 9th place)

Men's Long Jump
 Simone Bianchi
 Qualification — 7.79m (→ did not advance)

Men's Shot Put
 Paolo Dal Soglio
 Corrado Fantini
 Giorgio Venturi

Men's Discus Throw 
 Diego Fortuna
 Qualification — 60.08m (→ did not advance)

Men's Hammer Throw 
 Enrico Sgrulletti
 Qualification — 77.36m
 Final — 76.98m (→ 9th place)

 Loris Paoluzzi
 Qualification — 72.82m (→ did not advance)

Men's Decathlon 
 Beniamino Poserina
 Final Result — 7013 points (→ 30th place)

Men's 20 kilometres Walk
 Giovanni Perricelli
 Giovanni De Benedictis 
 Michele Didoni

Men's 50 kilometres Walk
 Arturo Di Mezza — 3'44:52 (→ 4th place)
 Giovanni Perricelli — 3'52:31 (→ 13th place)
 Giovanni De Benedictis — did not finish (→ no ranking)

Women's 400 metres 
 Virna De Angeli
 Patrizia Spuri

Women's 5,000 metres 
 Roberta Brunet
 Silvia Sommaggio

Women's 10,000 metres 
 Maria Guida
 Qualification — 31:55.35
 Final — did not start (→ no ranking)

 Silvia Sommaggio
 Qualification — 32:59.40 (→ did not advance)

Women's Marathon
 Ornella Ferrara — 2:33.09 (→ 13th place)
 Maria Curatolo — did not finish (→ no ranking)
 Maura Viceconte — did not finish (→ no ranking)

Women's 100m Hurdles
Carla Tuzzi

Women's 400m Hurdles
Virna de Angeli
 Qualification — 57.12 (→ did not advance)

Women's Discus Throw 
 Agnese Maffeis 
 Qualification — 56.54m (→ did not advance)

Women's High Jump
 Antonella Bevilacqua
 Qualification — 1.93m
 Final — 1.99m (→ 4th place)

Women's Long Jump 
 Fiona May
 Qualification — 6.85m 
 Final — 7.02m (→  Silver Medal)

Women's Triple Jump
 Barbara Lah
 Qualification — 13.74m (→ did not advance)

Women's Heptathlon
 Giuliana Spada

Women's 10 km Walk
 Elisabetta Perrone – 42:12 (→  Silver Medal)
 Rossella Giordano – 42:43 (→ 5th place)
 Annarita Sidoti – 43:57 (→ 11th place)

Baseball

The Italians were one of four teams that made their second appearance in Olympic baseball in 1996.  They improved slightly, upon their seventh-place finish of four years earlier by taking the middle place in a three-way tie for fifth through seventh places.  They had defeated Korea and Australia in the preliminary round but had lost their other five preliminary games.

Men's Team Competition:
 Italy – 6th place (2–5)

Team roster
Claudio Liverzani
Pier Paolo Illuminati
Roberto De Franceschi
David Rigoli
Marco Urbani
Francesco Casolari
Andrea Evangelisti
Enrico Vecchi
Massimiliano Masin
Paolo Ceccaroli
Ruggero Bagialemani
Paolo Passerini
Massimo Fochi
Alberto d'Auria
Roberto Cabalisti
Dante Cabrini
Marco Barboni
Rolando Cretis
Luigi Carrozza
Fabio Betto

Basketball

Women's tournament

Preliminary round

Quarterfinals

Classification Round 5th−8th place

7th place game

Beach volleyball

Andrea Ghiurghi and Nicola Grigolo — 13th place overall

Boxing

Men's Flyweight (51 kg)
Carmine Molaro
 First Round — Lost to Hussein Hussein (Australia), 8–11

Men's Lightweight (60 kg)
Christian Giantomassi
 First Round — Lost to Sergey Kopenkin (Kyrgyzstan), 11–12

Men's Light Middleweight (71 kg)
Antonio Perugino
 First Round — Defeated José Quinones (Puerto Rico), 10–8 
 Second Round — Defeated Roger Pettersson (Sweden), 18–4
 Quarter Finals — Lost to Alfredo Duvergel (Cuba), 8–15

Men's Light Heavyweight (81 kg)
Pietro Aurino
 First Round — Defeated Yusuf Öztürk (Turkey), 15–7 
 Second Round — Lost to Vassili Jirov (Kazakhstan), 13–18

Men's Super Heavyweight (> 91 kg)
Paolo Vidoz
 First Round — Bye
 Second Round — Lost to Alexis Rubalcaba (Cuba), referee stopped contest in first round

Canoeing

Cycling

Road Competition
Men's Individual Time Trial
Maurizio Fondriest 
 Final — 1:05:01 (→ 4th place)

Francesco Casagrande
 Final — 1:09:18 (→ 19th place)

Women's Individual Road Race
Imelda Chiappa 
 Final — 02:36:38 (→  Silver Medal)

Alessandra Cappellotto 
 Final — 02:37:06 (→ 7th place)

Roberta Bonanomi 
 Final — 02:37:06 (→ 32nd place)

Women's Individual Time Trial
Imelda Chiappa 
 Final – 38:47 (→ 8th place)

Track Competition
Men's Points Race
 Silvio Martinello
 Final — 37 points (→  Gold Medal)

Mountain Bike
Men's Cross Country
 Daniele Pontoni
 Final — 2:25:08 (→ 5th place)

 Luca Bramati
 Final — 2:26:05 (→ 8th place)

Women's Cross Country
 Paola Pezzo
 Final — 1:50.51 (→  Gold Medal)

 Annabella Stropparo
 Final — 1:55.56 (→ 6th place)

Diving

Men's 3m Springboard
Davide Lorenzini
Preliminary Round — 356.55
Semi Final — 202.80 (→ 15th place)

Women's 3m Springboard
Francesca d'Oriano
 Preliminary Heat — 208.77 (→ did not advance, 24th place)

Women's 10m Platform
Francesca d'Oriano
 Preliminary Heat — 202.86 (→ did not advance, 28th place)

Equestrian

Fencing

Sixteen fencers, nine men and seven women, represented Italy in 1996.

Men's foil
 Alessandro Puccini
 Stefano Cerioni
 Marco Arpino

Men's team foil
 Alessandro Puccini, Marco Arpino, Stefano Cerioni

Men's épée
 Sandro Cuomo
 Angelo Mazzoni
 Maurizio Randazzo

Men's team épée
 Sandro Cuomo, Angelo Mazzoni, Maurizio Randazzo

Men's sabre
 Tonhi Terenzi
 Luigi Tarantino
 Raffaelo Caserta

Men's team sabre
 Luigi Tarantino, Raffaelo Caserta, Tonhi Terenzi

Women's foil
 Valentina Vezzali
 Giovanna Trillini
 Diana Bianchedi

Women's team foil
 Francesca Bortolozzi-Borella, Giovanna Trillini, Valentina Vezzali

Women's épée
 Margherita Zalaffi
 Elisa Uga
 Laura Chiesa

Women's team épée
 Elisa Uga, Laura Chiesa, Margherita Zalaffi

Football

Men's team competition
Preliminary round (group C)
 Defeated  (2–1) → Did not advance

Team roster
 Gianluca Pagliuca
 Christian Panucci
 Alessandro Nesta
 Fabio Cannavaro
 Fabio Galante 
 Salvatore Fresi 
 Raffaele Ametrano 
 Massimo Crippa
 Marco Branca
 Massimo Brambilla
 Marco Delvecchio
 Gianluigi Buffon
 Alessandro Pistone
 Damiano Tommasi
 Fabio Pecchia
 Domenico Morfeo
 Cristiano Lucarelli
 Antonino Bernardini
 Luigi Sartor
Head coach: Cesare Maldini

Gymnastics

Judo

Modern pentathlon

Men's Individual Competition:
 Cesare Toraldo – 5402 pts (→ 8th place)
 Fabio Nebuloni – 5285 pts (→ 17th place)
 Alessandro Conforto – 5128 pts (→ 25th place)

Rhythmic gymnastics

Rowing

Sailing

Shooting

Swimming

Men's 50m Freestyle
 René Gusperti
 Heat – 22.85
 B-Final – 22.96 (→ 14th place)

Men's 200m Freestyle
 Massimiliano Rosolino
 Heat – 1:48.80
 Final – 1:48.50 (→ 6th place)

 Pier Maria Siciliano
 Heat – 1:49.88
 B-Final – 1:50.07 (→ 13th place)

Men's 400m Freestyle
 Emiliano Brembilla
 Heat – 3:49.35
 Final – 3:49.87 (→ 4th place)

 Massimiliano Rosolino
 Heat – 3:51.05
 Final – 3:51.04 (→ 6th place)

Men's 1500m Freestyle
 Emiliano Brembilla
 Heat – 15:16.72 
 Final – 15:08.58 (→ 4th place)

 Marco Formentini
 Heat – 15:41.14 (→ did not advance, 18th place)

Men's 100m Backstroke
 Emanuele Merisi
 Heat – 55.82
 Final – 55.53 (→ 6th place)

Men's 200m Backstroke
 Emanuele Merisi
 Heat – 2:00.01
 Final – 1:59.18 (→  Bronze Medal)

 Mirko Mazzari
 Heat – 1:59.95
 Final – 2:01.27 (→ 7th place)

Men's 100m Butterfly
 Andrea Oriana
 Heat – 56.04 (→ did not advance, 39th place)

Men's 200m Butterfly
 Andrea Oriana
 Heat – 2:00.67 (→ did not advance, 17th place)

Men's 200m Individual Medley
 Luca Sacchi
 Heat – 2:03.24
 B-Final – 2:03.49 (→ 11th place)

Men's 400m Individual Medley
 Luca Sacchi
 Heat – 4:19.63
 Final – 4:18.31 (→ 6th place)

Men's 4 × 200 m Freestyle Relay
 Emiliano Brembilla,  Emanuele Idini, Pier Maria Siciliano, and Massimiliano Rosolino
 Heat – 7:22.69
 Massimiliano Rosolino, Emanuele Idini, Emanuele Merisi, and Pier Maria Siciliano
 Final – 7:19.92 (→ 6th place)

Women's 100m Freestyle
 Cecilia Vianini
 Heat – 57.17 (→ did not advance, 24th place)

Women's 200m Backstroke
 Lorenza Vigarani
 Heat – 2:13.58 
 Final – 2:14.56 (→ 7th place)

Women's 100m Breaststroke
 Manuela Dalla Valle
 Heat – 1:10.25  
 B-Final – 1:11.19 (→ 15th place)

Women's 100m Butterfly
 Ilaria Tocchini
 Heat – 1:01.83 (→ did not advance, 17th place)

Women's 200m Butterfly
 Ilaria Tocchini
 Heat – 2:16.10 (→ did not advance, 17th place)

Women's 4 × 100 m Medley Relay
Lorenza Vigarani, Manuela Dalla Valle, Ilaria Tocchini, and Cecilia Vianini
 Heat – 4:10.57
 Final – 4:10.59 (→ 8th place)

Synchronized swimming

Table tennis

Tennis

Men's Singles Competition
 Renzo Furlan
 First round — Defeated Jiří Novák (Czech Republic) 4–5 6–4 6–3
 Second round — Defeated Luis Morejon (Ecuador) 7–5 6–2
 Third round — Defeated Marc Rosset (Switzerland) 6–2 4–2 retired
 Quarter Finals — Lost to Leander Paes (India) 1–6 9–7

 Andrea Gaudenzi
 First round — Defeated Carlos Costa (Spain) 6–3 6–2
 Second round — Defeated Oscar Ortiz (Mexico) 6–1 7–6
 Third round — Lost to Andre Agassi (United States) 6–2 4–6 2–6

Women's Singles Competition
 Rita Grande
 First round — Lost to Patricia Hy-Boulais (Canada) 4–6 4–6

 Silvia Farina
 First round — Defeated Clare Wood (Great Britain) 6–2 6–2
 Second round — Lost to Arantxa Sánchez Vicario (Spain) 1–6 3–6

Volleyball

Men's Indoor Team Competition
Preliminary round (group B)
Defeated South Korea (3–0)
Defeated Tunisia (3–0)
Defeated Netherlands (3–0)
Defeated Russia (3–0)
Defeated Yugoslavia (3–0)
Quarterfinals
Defeated Brazil (3–2)
Semifinals
Defeated Yugoslavia (3–1)
Final
Lost to the Netherlands (2–3) →  Silver Medal

Team roster
Lorenzo Bernardi 
Vigor Bovolenta 
Marco Bracci 
Luca Cantagalli 
Andrea Gardini 
Andrea Giani 
Pasquale Gravina 
Marco Meoni 
Samuele Papi 
Andrea Sartoretti 
Paolo Tofoli
Andrea Zorzi 
Head coach: Julio Velasco

Water polo

Men's team competition
Preliminary round (group B)
 Defeated United States (10–7)
 Defeated Ukraine (8–6)
 Defeated Croatia (10–8)
 Defeated Greece (10–8)
 Defeated Romania (10–9)
Quarterfinals
 Defeated Russia (11–9)
Semifinals
 Lost to Croatia (6–7)
Bronze Medal Match
 Defeated Hungary (20–18) →  Bronze Medal

Team roster
Francesco Attolico
Francesco Postiglione
Alessandro Bovo
Fabio Bencivenga
Alessandro Calcaterra
Roberto Calcaterra
Luca Giustolisi
Alberto Angelini
Amedeo Pomilio
Marco Gerini
Leonardo Sottani
Carlo Silipo
Alberto Ghibellini

Weightlifting

Wrestling

References

External links
 

Nations at the 1996 Summer Olympics
1996 Summer Olympics
Olympics